Josh Lord may refer to:
 Josh Lord (artist)
 Josh Lord (rugby union)